Mallika Chopra (born July 24, 1971) is an American author and businesswoman.

Biography 
Chopra grew up in Lincoln, Massachusetts, United States of America. She attended Concord Academy in nearby Concord, Massachusetts. She has a Bachelor of Arts from Brown University, and an MBA from Kellogg School of Management. She also holds a Master's degree in Psychology and Education from Columbia University.

Earlier in 2000, she had co-founded the dotcom mypotential.com along with her father Deepak Chopra. She is also the president of Chopra Media LLC and sits on the board of directors of Liquid Comics (previously known as Virgin Comics). She also blogs for Beliefnet and Huffington Post.

She's authored several self-help books for adults and children books based on affirmation. 

Chopra has two daughters.

Books 
Her first two books, 100 Promises To My Baby and 100 Questions From My Child, have been translated and sold in dozens of countries worldwide.

Chopra's book Living With Intent: My Somewhat Messy Journey to Purpose, Peace, and Joy, was released in 2015.

Her fourth book, Just Breathe: Meditation, Mindfulness, Movement and More, is a meditation guide for children. It was published in 2018.

References

Bibliography 
 
 
 Living With Intent: My Somewhat Messy Journey to Purpose, Peace and Joy. Harmony. 2015.
 Just Breathe: Meditation, Mindfulness, Movement, and More. Running Press Kids. 2018.

External links 
 Mallika Chopra's personal web site

1971 births
Living people
People from Lincoln, Massachusetts
American people of Indian descent
American family and parenting writers
American self-help writers
American women chief executives
American women non-fiction writers
American women writers of Indian descent
Brown University alumni
Kellogg School of Management alumni
Columbia University alumni
21st-century American non-fiction writers
21st-century American women writers
Place of birth missing (living people)
Concord Academy alumni